Turbo setosus, common name the rough turban, is a species of sea snail, marine gastropod mollusk in the family Turbinidae.

 Taxonomic status: Some authors place the name in the subgenus Turbo (Marmarostoma)

Description
The length of the shell varies between 22 mm and 80 mm. The solid, imperforate shell has an ovate-pointed shape. Its color pattern is whitish, or greenish, maculated with brown and olive. The conic spire is acute. The six whorls are convex, striate and spirally lirate. The ridges are unequal, wider than the interspaces, frequently with interstitial lirulae. The large aperture lis oval and white within. The outer lip is frequently green-tinged and is fluted. The arcuate columella is deflexed and dilated at its base.

The circular operculum is flat or slightly concave within. It contains four whorls and a subcentral apex. The outer surface is convex, brown, coarsely granulose in the middle, paler and more finely granular at the margins.

Distribution
This species occurs in the Indian Ocean off Madagascar, the Mascarene Basin and Mauritius; in the Central and Southwest Pacific; off Australia.

References

Notes
 Hedley, C. (1899). The Mollusca of Funafuti. Part 1. Gastropoda. Australian Museum Memoires. 3 (7)
 Allan, J., 1950. Australian Shells: with related animals living in the sea, in freshwater and on the land. Georgian House, Melbourne. xix 470 pp
 Demond, J., 1957. Micronesian reef associated gastropods. Pacific Science, 11(3):275–341
 Salvat, B. & Rives, C. (1975). Coquillages de Polynésie. Papeete - Tahiti : les editions du pacifique. pp. 1–391
 Drivas, J. & M. Jay (1988). Coquillages de La Réunion et de l'île Maurice
 Alf A. & Kreipl K. (2003). A Conchological Iconography: The Family Turbinidae, Subfamily Turbininae, Genus Turbo. Conchbooks, Hackenheim Germany.
 Williams, S.T. (2007). Origins and diversification of Indo-West Pacific marine fauna: evolutionary history and biogeography of turban shells (Gastropoda, Turbinidae). Biological Journal of the Linnean Society, 2007, 92, 573–592

External links
 

setosus
Gastropods described in 1791
Taxa named by Johann Friedrich Gmelin